Comcast Corporation (formerly known as American Cable Systems and Comcast Holdings), headquartered in Philadelphia, is the largest American multinational telecommunications conglomerate. It is the second-largest broadcasting and cable television company in the world by revenue (behind AT&T), the largest pay-TV company, the largest cable TV company and largest home Internet service provider in the United States, and the nation's third-largest home telephone service provider. It provides services to U.S. residential and commercial customers in 40 states and the District of Columbia. As the parent company of the international media company NBCUniversal since 2011, Comcast is a producer of feature films for theatrical exhibition, and over-the-air and cable television programming.

Comcast owns and operates the Xfinity residential cable communications subsidiary, Comcast Business, a commercial services provider; Xfinity Mobile, an MVNO of Verizon; over-the-air national broadcast network channels (NBC, Telemundo, TeleXitos, and Cozi TV); multiple cable-only channels (including MSNBC, CNBC, USA Network, Syfy, Oxygen, Bravo, and E!); the film studio Universal Pictures; the VOD streaming service Peacock; animation studios (DreamWorks Animation, Illumination, Universal Animation Studios) and Universal Parks & Resorts. It also has significant holdings in digital distribution, such as thePlatform, which it acquired in 2006; and ad-tech company FreeWheel, which it acquired in 2014. Since October 2018, it has also been the parent company of Sky Group.

Comcast has been criticized for a variety of reasons. Its customer satisfaction ratings were among the lowest in the cable industry during the years 2008–2010. It has violated net neutrality practices in the past, and, despite its commitment to a narrow definition of net neutrality, critics advocate a definition that precludes any distinction between Comcast's private network services and the rest of the Internet. Critics also point out a lack of competition in the vast majority of Comcast's service areas; in particular, the limited competition among cable providers. Given its negotiating power as a large ISP, some suspect that it could leverage paid peering agreements to unfairly influence end-user connection speeds. Its ownership of both content production (in NBCUniversal) and distribution (as an ISP) has raised antitrust concerns. These issues and others led to Comcast being dubbed "The Worst Company in America" by The Consumerist in 2010 and 2014.

Overview

Leadership
Comcast is described as a family business. Brian L. Roberts, its chairman, president and CEO, is the son of founder Ralph J. Roberts (1920–2015). Roberts owns or controls about 1% of all Comcast shares but all of the Class B supervoting shares, giving him an "undilutable 33% voting power over the company". Legal expert Susan P. Crawford has said this gives him "effective control over [Comcast's] every step". In 2010, he was one of the highest paid executives in the United States, with total compensation of about $31 million.

Board of directors
As of May 17, 2020:
 Brian L. Roberts, chairman and CEO of Comcast
 Kenneth J. Bacon, former Fannie Mae executive
 Madeline S. Bell, president and CEO of Children's Hospital of Philadelphia
 Edward D. Breen (lead independent director), executive chairman and CEO of DuPont
 Gerald Hassell, former chairman and CEO of The Bank of New York Mellon
 Jeffrey Honickman, CEO of Pepsi-Cola Bottling
 Maritza Montiel, former deputy chairman and CEO of Deloitte
 Asuka Nakahara, former CFO of Trammell Crow
 David C. Novak, former chairman and CEO of YUM! Brands

Corporate offices
Comcast is headquartered in Philadelphia, Pennsylvania, and has offices in Atlanta, Detroit, Denver, Manchester, New Hampshire and New York City. In the fall of 2018, it finished construction of the  Comcast Technology Center, Pennsylvania's tallest skyscraper, adjacent to its original headquarters. As of 2019, the company had 184,000 employees.

Employee relations
Comcast is often criticized by the media and its own staff for its less-than-upstanding policies of employee relations.

A 2014 investigative series published by The Verge involved interviews with 150 Comcast employees, and examined why the company was so widely criticized by its customers, the media, and its own workers. It concluded that Comcast's staff endured unreasonable corporate policies: "Customer service has been replaced by an obsession with sales; technicians are understaffed … tech support is poorly trained, and the company is hobbled by internal fragmentation." A widely read article by an anonymous Comcast call center employee appeared in November 2014 on Cracked. Titled "Five Nightmares You Live While Working For America's Worst Company", it claimed that Comcast was obsessed with sales, didn't train its employees properly, and concluded that "the system makes good customer service impossible."

Comcast has also earned a reputation as anti-union. A company training manual says, "Comcast does not feel union representation is in the best interest of its employees, customers, or shareholders". A dispute in 2004 with CWA, a labor union representing many employees at Comcast's Beaverton, Oregon offices, led to allegations of management intimidating workers, requiring them to attend anti-union meetings and unwarranted disciplinary action for union members. In 2011, Comcast received criticism from Writers Guild of America for its policies regarding unions.

Despite these criticisms, Comcast has appeared on multiple "top places to work" lists. In 2009, it was included on CableFAX magazine's "Top 10 Places to Work in Cable", which cited its "scale, savvy and vision". Similarly, the Philadelphia Business Journal awarded Comcast the silver medal among extra-large companies in Philadelphia, with the gold medal going to partner organization, Comcast-Spectacor. The Boston Globe found Comcast to be that city's top place to work in 2009. Employee diversity is also an attribute upon which Comcast receives strong marks. In 2008, Black Enterprise magazine rated Comcast among the top 15 companies for workforce diversity. Comcast was also named a "Top 2014 Workplace" by The Washington Post in their annual feature. The Human Rights Campaign has given Comcast a 100 on the Corporate Equality Index and one of the best places for LGBT people to work.

Financial performance
The book value of the company nearly doubled from $8.19 a share in 1999 to $15 a share in 2009. Revenues grew sixfold from 1999's $6 billion to almost $36 billion in 2009. Net profit margin rose from 4.2% in 1999 to 8.4% in 2009, with operating margins improving 31% and return on equity doubling to 6.7% in the same time span. Between 1999 and 2009, return on capital nearly tripled to 7%. Comcast reported first quarter 2012 profit increases of 30% due to increase in high-speed internet customers. In February 2014, Comcast generated $1.1 billion in revenue during the first quarter due to the 2014 Winter Olympics in Sochi. , Comcast is ranked 28th on the Fortune 500 rankings of the largest United States corporations by total revenue.

For the fiscal year 2017, Comcast reported earnings of US$22.7 billion, with an annual revenue of US$84.5 billion, an increase of 5.5% over the previous fiscal cycle. Comcast's shares traded at over $47 per share, and its market capitalization was valued at over US$213.4 billion in February 2022.

Lobbying and electoral fundraising
With $18.8 million spent in 2013, Comcast has the seventh largest lobbying budget of any individual company or organization in the United States. Comcast employs multiple former U.S. Congressmen as lobbyists. The National Cable & Telecommunications Association, which has multiple Comcast executives on its board, also represents Comcast and other cable companies as the fifth largest lobbying organization in the United States, spending $19.8 million in 2013. Comcast was among the top backers of Barack Obama's presidential runs, with Comcast vice president David Cohen raising over $2.2 million from 2007 to 2012. Cohen has been described by many sources as influential in the U.S. government, though he is no longer a registered lobbyist, as the time he spends lobbying falls short of the 20% which requires official registration. Comcast's PAC, the Comcast Corporation and NBCUniversal Political Action Committee, is among the largest PACs in the U.S., raising about $3.7 million from 2011 to 2012 for the campaigns of various candidates for office in the United States Federal Government. Comcast is also a major backer of the National Cable and Telecommunications Association Political Action Committee, which raised $2.6 million from 2011 to 2012. Comcast spent the most money of any organization in support of the Stop Online Piracy and PROTECT IP bills, spending roughly $5 million to lobby for their passage.

Comcast also backs lobbying and PACs on a regional level, backing organizations such as the Tennessee Cable Telecommunications Association and the Broadband Communications Association of Washington PAC. Comcast and other cable companies have lobbied state governments to pass legislation restricting or banning individual cities from offering public broadband service. Municipal broadband restrictions of varying scope have been passed in a total of 20 U.S. States.

According to watchdog group Documented, in 2020 Comcast contributed $200,000 to the Rule of Law Defense Fund, a fund-raising arm of the Republican Attorneys General Association that was shown to have provided funding to the Save America March that devolved into an attack on the U.S. Capitol on January 6, 2021.

Philanthropy

Comcast offers low cost internet and cable service to schools, subsidized by general broadband consumers through the U.S. government's E-Rate program. Critics have noted that many of the strongest supporters of Comcast's business deals have received substantial funding from the Comcast Foundation. However, it is important to note that for years, Comcast has been relying on subsidiaries to finance philanthropic pursuits.

History

American Cable Systems
In 1963, Ralph J. Roberts in conjunction with his two business partners, Daniel Aaron and Julian A. Brodsky, purchased American Cable Systems as a corporate spin-off from its parent, Jerrold Electronics, for U.S. $500,000. At the time, American Cable was a small cable operator in Tupelo, Mississippi, with five channels and 12,000 customers. In 1965, American Cable Systems purchased Storecast Corporation of America, a product placement supermarket specialist marketing firm. In 1968, American Cable Systems purchased its first franchise of Muzak, a brand of background music played in retail stores. Storecast was a client of Muzak.

Comcast

The company was re-incorporated in Pennsylvania on March 5, 1969, under the new name Comcast Corporation. Comcast's initial public offering occurred on June 29, 1972, with a market capitalization of U.S. $3,010,000. In 1977, HBO was first launched on a Comcast system with 20,000 customers in western Pennsylvania with a five-night free preview getting a 15% sign up rate. In 1986, Comcast bought 26% of Group W Cable, a broadcast company, doubling its number of subscribers to 1 million. Also that year, Comcast made a founding investment of $380 million in QVC. In 1988, Comcast was able to buy a 50% share of SCI Holdings in a joint deal with Tele-Communications Inc. Comcast also acquired American Cellular Network Corporation in 1988 for $230 million, marking the first time it became a mobile phone operator.

Increasing market share (1990–2001)
In February 1990, Ralph Roberts' son, Brian L. Roberts, succeeded his father as president of Comcast. Two years later, the company's mobile division, Comcast Cellular, purchased a controlling interest in Metromedia's Philadelphia-area cellular telephone interests, Metrophone. By 1994, Comcast owned 50% stock in the cable communications company Garden State Cable, who by that year were serving approximately 195,000 subscribers. That same year, Comcast became the third-largest cable operator in the United States, with around 3.5 million subscribers following its purchase of Maclean-Hunter's American division for $1.27 billion. Comcast grew to 4.3 million subscribers the following year with the purchase of the cable operation of E. W. Scripps Company for $1.575 billion in stock.

Comcast offered internet connection for the first time in 1996, with its part in the launch of the @Home Network. Also in 1996, Comcast formed Comcast Spectacor, which became owner of the Philadelphia Flyers. In 1997, Microsoft invested $1 billion in Comcast, and the company launched its digital TV service. That same year, in partnership with Disney, Comcast got a 50.1% controlling interest in E! Entertainment. By December 31, 1997, it was available in the Philadelphia, Detroit, Baltimore, Orange County, California, Sarasota and Union, New Jersey areas. 

Comcast's cable acquisitions in 1997 were Jones Intercable, Inc. with 1 million customers, and a stake in Prime Communications with 430,000 subscribers. In February 1998, Comcast sold its U.K. division to NTL for US$600 million, along with the division's $397 million in debt. In 1999, Comcast sold Comcast Cellular to SBC Communications for $400 million, releasing them from $1.27 billion in debt. Also in 1999, Comcast acquired Greater Philadelphia Cablevision, and launched Comcast University as well as Comcast Interactive Capital Group.

In November 1999, Comcast purchased Lenfest Communications, who were the ninth largest cable television operator at the time and were the largest operator in the Philadelphia area. This consolidated Comcast's control over all of the Philadelphia region, and earned them approximately 1.3 million additional cable subscribers. The purchase of Lenfest also bought Comcast the remaining 50% stock of the cable operator Garden State Communications — a company whom Comcast had already owned half of in partnership with Lenfest for years. Comcast quickly replaced the ten-year general manager at Garden State with their own executive, and eventually Garden State ceased operating under its own name and was fully merged to become a part of the Comcast Corporation.

Largest U.S. cable provider (2001–present)

In 2001, Comcast announced it would acquire the assets of the largest cable television operator at the time, AT&T Broadband, for $44.5 billion. The proposed name for the merged company was "AT&T Comcast", but the companies ultimately decided to keep only the Comcast name, with the company and new assets reincorporated in Pennsylvania on December 7, 2001. On November 18, 2002, Comcast officially acquired all assets of AT&T Broadband, thus making Comcast the largest cable television company in the United States with over 22 million subscribers. This spurred the start of Comcast Advertising Sales (using AT&T's groundwork) which would later be renamed Comcast Spotlight and now effectv, A Comcast Company. As part of this acquisition, Comcast also acquired the National Digital Television Center in Centennial, Colorado as a wholly owned subsidiary, now known as the Comcast Media Center. In 2003, Comcast became one of the original investors in The Golf Channel. After Excite@Home went bankrupt in October 2001, Comcast took over providing internet directly to consumers in January 2002.

On February 11, 2004, Comcast announced a $54 billion bid for The Walt Disney Company, including taking on $12 billion of Disney's debt. The deal would have made Comcast the largest media conglomerate in the world. However, after rejection by Disney and uncertain response from investors, the bid was abandoned in April. In 2004, Comcast sold its QVC shares to Liberty Media for $7.9 billion.

On April 8, 2005, a partnership led by Comcast and Sony Pictures Entertainment finalized a deal to acquire MGM and its affiliate studio, United Artists, and created an additional outlet to carry MGM/UA's material for cable and Internet distribution. On October 31, 2005, Comcast officially announced that it had acquired Susquehanna Communications, a South Central Pennsylvania-based cable television and broadband services provider and unit of the former Susquehanna Pfaltzgraff company, for $775 million cash. Comcast previously owned approximately 30% of Susquehanna Communications through its affiliate company, Lenfest. In December 2005, Comcast announced the creation of Comcast Interactive Media, a new division focused on online media.

In July 2006, Comcast purchased the Seattle-based software company thePlatform. This represented an entry into a new line of business—selling software to allow companies to manage their Internet (and IP-based) media publishing efforts.

On April 3, 2007, Comcast announced it would acquire the cable systems owned and operated by Patriot Media, a privately held company owned by cable veteran Steven J. Simmons, Spectrum Equity Investors and Spire Capital, that served approximately 81,000 video subscribers for $483 million.

Comcast announced in May 2007 and launched in September 2008 a dashboard called SmartZone that allowed users to perform mobile functions online. There was also Cloudmark spam and phishing protection and Trend Micro antivirus. The address book is Comcast Plaxo software.

In May 2008, Comcast purchased Plaxo for a reported $150 million to $170 million.

Comcast won the Consumerist Worst Company In America ("Golden Poo") award in 2010. A gold trophy in the shape of a pile of human feces was delivered to Comcast Corporate Headquarters to commemorate the unmatched level of enmity flowing from their customer base to their business. Comcast responded immediately by publicly acknowledging the dubious award and citing ongoing efforts to improve its customer service. One effort to change this is a new app called Tech ETA that allows customers to see exactly when a technician is coming.

Adelphia purchase
In April 2005, Comcast and Time Warner Cable announced plans to buy the assets of bankrupted Adelphia Cable. The two companies paid a total of $17.6 billion in the deal that was finalized in the second quarter of 2006—after the U.S. Federal Communications Commission (FCC) completed a seven-month investigation without raising an objection. Time Warner Cable became the second-largest cable provider in the U.S., ranking behind Comcast. As part of the deal, Time Warner Cable and Comcast traded existing subscribers in order to consolidate them into larger geographic clusters.

In August 2006, Comcast and Time Warner Cable dissolved a 50/50 partnership that controlled the systems in the Houston, Southwest Texas, San Antonio, and Kansas City markets under the Time Warner Cable brand. After the dissolution, Comcast obtained the Houston system, and Time Warner retained the others. On January 1, 2007, Comcast officially took control of the Houston system but continued to operate under the Time Warner Cable brand until June 19, 2007.

NBCUniversal

Media outlets began reporting in late September 2009 that Comcast was in talks to buy NBC Universal. Comcast denied the rumors at first, while NBC would not comment on them. However, CNBC itself reported on October 1 that General Electric was considering spinning NBC Universal off into a separate company that would merge the NBC television network and its cable properties such as USA Network, Syfy and MSNBC, as well as Universal Studios, with Comcast's content assets. GE would maintain 49% control of the new company, while Comcast owned 51%. Vivendi, which owns 20%, would have to sell its stake to GE. It was reported that under the current deal with GE that it would happen in November or December. It was also reported that Time Warner would be interested in placing a bid, until CEO Jeffrey L. Bewkes directly denied interest, leaving Comcast the sole bidder. On November 1, 2009, The New York Times reported Comcast had moved closer to a deal to purchase NBC Universal and that a formal announcement could be made sometime the following week.

Following a tentative agreement on December 1, the parties announced that Comcast would buy a controlling 51% stake in NBC Universal, including Universal Pictures, for $6.5 billion in cash and $7.3 billion in programming on December 3. GE would take over the remaining 49% stake in NBC Universal, using $5.8 billion to buy out Vivendi's 20% minority stake in NBC Universal. On January 18, 2011, the FCC approved the deal by a vote of 4 to 1. The transaction was completed on January 28, 2011. In December 2012, Comcast adopted a new corporate logo, which incorporates NBC's peacock logo to signify its ownership of the broadcaster. On February 12, 2013, Comcast announced that it would acquire the remaining 49% of General Electric's interest in NBCUniversal, in a deal valued at approximately $16.7 billion. The acquisition was completed on March 19, 2013.

Comcast reported that third-quarter net profits in 2020 fell 37 percent to $2.02 billion from $3.22 billion the previous year, in part due to the limited capacity measures for the COVID-19 pandemic at theme parks like Universal Studios and movie theaters, with revenues falling 4.8 percent. With their theme park in California being closed since March 2020 and limited capacity at locations in Florida and Japan, the company was prompted to lay off a number of their employees; revenue for their theme park locations fell 81 percent to $311 million from $1.63 billion in 2019.

Failed purchase of Time Warner Cable

On February 12, 2014, the Los Angeles Times reported that Comcast sought to acquire Time Warner Cable in a deal valued at $45.2 billion. On February 13, it was reported that Time Warner Cable agreed to the acquisition. This was to add several metropolitan areas to the Comcast portfolio, such as New York City, Los Angeles, Dallas–Fort Worth, Cleveland, Columbus, Cincinnati, Charlotte, San Diego, and San Antonio. Time Warner Cable and Comcast aimed to merge into one company by the end of 2014 and both have praised the deal, emphasizing the increased capabilities of a combined telecommunications network, and to "create operating efficiencies and economies of scale".

In 2014, critics expressed concern that the deal would give Comcast greater negotiating power in a number of areas, including rebroadcast fees with television channels, and peering agreements with ISPs.

Critics noted in 2013 that Tom Wheeler, the head of the FCC, which has to approve the deal, is the former head of both the largest cable lobbying organization, the National Cable & Telecommunications Association, and as largest wireless lobby, CTIA – The Wireless Association. According to Politico, Comcast "donated to almost every member of Congress who has a hand in regulating it". The U.S. Senate Judiciary Committee held a hearing on the deal on April 9, 2014. The House Judiciary Committee planned its own hearing. On March 6, 2014, the United States Department of Justice Antitrust Division confirmed it was investigating the deal. In March 2014, the division's chairman, William Baer, recused himself because he was involved in the prior Comcast NBCUniversal acquisition. Several states' attorneys general have announced support for the federal investigation. On April 24, 2015, Jonathan Sallet, general counsel of the F.C.C., explained that he was going to recommend a hearing before an administrative law judge, equivalent to a collapse of the deal.

In August 2015, Comcast announced to speed up Internet for low-income customers from 5 megabits per second (mbps) to 10 Mbit/s, provide free wireless routers, and will pilot an initiative to increase Internet access for low-income senior citizens. In September of that year Comcast also launched Watchable, a YouTube competitor. The move was seen by Variety as an attempt to appeal to the cord-cutting market.

DreamWorks Animation

In April 2016, Comcast confirmed that its NBCUniversal division would acquire DreamWorks Animation for $3.8 billion. The deal closed on August 22, 2016; DreamWorks Animation was integrated into NBCUniversal Film and Entertainment as part of Universal Pictures. Universal Pictures took over distribution of DreamWorks Animation films beginning in 2019 with How to Train Your Dragon: The Hidden World after DreamWorks Animation's deal with 20th Century Fox expired.

Cellular service
In September 2016, Comcast confirmed that it had reached a partnership with Verizon Wireless to launch a cellular network as an MVNO. The new service, described as being a "Wi-Fi and MVNO-integrated product", and was expected to launch in mid-2017. The partnership and the addition of wireless would allow Comcast to offer a quadruple play of services. Including Comcast's Home Security offering, customers now have the option of a Quintuple Play. The service was officially announced on April 6, 2017, as Xfinity Mobile.

Attempted acquisition of Fox and subsequence of Sky 

On November 16, 2017, it was reported that Comcast attempted to purchase 21st Century Fox, following the news 10 days earlier that The Walt Disney Company negotiated with Fox to acquire the same assets. Like Disney, the deal included the 20th Century Fox film and television studios, cable entertainment and broadcast satellite networks including FX Networks, National Geographic Partners, Fox Sports Networks, and international channels such as Star India. It would not include the Fox Broadcasting Company, Fox Television Stations, Fox Sports, and Fox News units, all which will be spun-off into a new independent company, which is later known as the Fox Corporation since the 2019 launch.

However, on December 11, 2017, Comcast officially dropped the bid, saying that "We never got the level of engagement needed to make a definitive offer." On December 14, Disney officially confirmed its acquisition of 21st Century Fox for $52.4 billion in stock, pending review from the United States Department of Justice Antitrust Division.

On February 5, 2018, a new report by CNBC claims that despite the Disney/Fox deal, Comcast was considering topping Disney's $52.4 billion offer once the AT&T–Time Warner merger goes through, after the Department of Justice Antitrust Division sued to block the merger on November 20, 2017.

On February 27, 2018, Comcast offered to purchase 61% stake in Sky plc at a value of £12.50 per-share, approximately £22.1 billion. 21st Century Fox, which owns 39% stake in Sky, had previously declined a US$60 billion acquisition offer by Comcast in favor of its deal with Disney, due to anti-competition concerns. NBCUniversal CEO Steve Burke stated that purchasing Sky would roughly double its presence in English-speaking markets, and allow for synergies between the respective networks and studios of NBCUniversal and Sky. Fox stated that it "remains committed to its recommended cash offer for Sky", and that Comcast had not yet made a "firm offer".

On April 12, the Panel on Takeovers and Mergers ruled that Disney had to acquire all of Sky within 28 days of fully acquiring Fox if the latter's acquisition of Sky was not completed by the time the merger was done, or if Comcast's counter-offer wasn't accepted. On April 25, 2018, Comcast made its formal counter-bid for Sky plc, offering £12.50 per-share; Sky subsequently withdrew its recommendation of the Fox bid.

On May 7, 2018, Comcast announced a potential bid against Disney's effort to acquire Fox after it spoke to investment banks about making a $60 billion cash offer, pending on approval of the AT&T–Time Warner merger. Eight days later, several Fox investors expressed interests in signing a deal with Comcast due to their all-cash offer as opposed to Disney's $52.4 billion stock offer. Then on June 5, 2018, Culture Secretary Matt Hancock cleared both 21st Century Fox and Comcast's respective offers to acquire Sky plc. Fox's offer is contingent on the divestiture of Sky News. Eight days later, Comcast officially announced a $65 billion counter-offer to acquire the 21st Century Fox's assets that Disney offered to purchase.

On June 15, 2018, the European Commission gave antitrust clearance to Comcast's offer to purchase Sky, citing that in terms of their current assets in Europe, there would be limited impact on competition. Comcast included a 10-year commitment to the operations and funding of Sky News similar to that of Disney's offer. On June 19, 2018, Disney formally agreed to acquire Sky News as part of Fox's proposed bid, with a 15-year commitment to increase its annual funding from £90 million to £100 million.

However, on June 20, 2018, Disney and Fox announced that they had amended their previous merger agreement, upping Disney's offer to $71.3 billion (a 10% premium over Comcast's $65 billion offer), while also offering shareholders the option of receiving cash instead of stock. On June 27, the United States Department of Justice gave antitrust approval to Disney under the condition of selling Fox's 22 regional sports channels, to which the company has agreed. On the next day, Disney and Fox shareholders scheduled July 27, 2018 as the day to vote on Fox's properties being sold to Disney, giving Comcast enough time to make a higher counter-offer for the Fox assets.

On July 11, 2018, 21st Century Fox raised its bid to purchase Sky plc assets to $32.5 billion, and $18.57 a share. In response, Comcast increased its bid to $34 billion, and $19.5 a share. At the same time, Fox was given clearance by the British government to purchase Sky. On July 18, 2018, Bloomberg reported that the Sky board scheduled July 27, 2018 as the day shareholders vote on selling Sky properties.

However, on July 12, 2018, the Department of Justice filed a notice of appeal with the D.C. Circuit to reverse the District Court's approval for AT&T acquisition of Time Warner (now renamed WarnerMedia). Although analysts say that the chances of the DOJ win are small, they say it is the "final nail in the coffin for Comcast's Fox chase. This is a clear gift to Disney." On the next day, CEO of AT&T Randall Stephenson gave an interview with CNBC, about Comcast's bid for Fox: "It probably can't help it. You're in a situation where two entities are bidding for an asset, and this kind of action can obviously influence the outcome of those actions."

On July 16, 2018, CNBC reported that Comcast was unlikely to continue its bidding war to acquire Fox from Disney in favor of Sky. Three days later, Comcast officially announced that it was dropping its bid on the Fox assets in order to focus on their bid for Sky. CEO of Comcast, Brian L. Roberts said: "I'd like to congratulate Bob Iger and the team at Disney and commend the Murdoch family and Fox for creating such a desirable and respected company." Eight days later, 21st Century Fox shareholders agreed to sell the majority of its assets to Disney for $71.3 billion. The sale covered the majority of 21CF's entertainment assets, including 20th Century Fox, FX Networks, and National Geographic Partners among others.

On September 22, 2018, Comcast outbid 21st Century Fox, by raising its bid for Sky plc to $40 billion, or $22.57 a share. On September 25, 2018, Comcast bought a 30% stake of Sky plc. The next day on September 26, 2018, Fox with the consent of its acquirer sold its 39% stake to Comcast in exchange for $15 billion in cash. In October 2018 Comcast later acquired the rest of the shares of Sky with the company being delisted in November. The merger was completed on November 7, 2018 when the company was delisted after becoming a wholly owned subsidiary and division of Comcast.

On June 20, 2022, Comcast acquired Levl, an American-Israeli startup develops technology that authenticates wireless devices and can help prevent hacking, for an estimated $50 million. Following the acquisition, Comcast announced it will set up its first development center in Israel.

Divisions and subsidiaries

Comcast Cable (Xfinity)

Comcast Cable, which goes by the brand name Xfinity, provides cable television, broadband internet, and home telephone services. Comcast Cable also provides similar services to small to medium-sized business through its Comcast Business brand, and Fortune 1000 companies through its Comcast Enterprise brand.

NBCUniversal

Comcast delivers third-party television programming content to its own customers, and also produces its own first-party content both for subscribers and customers of other competing television services. Fully or partially owned Comcast programming includes Comcast Newsmakers, Comcast SportsNet, SportsNet New York, MLB Network, The Golf Channel, Syfy, and USA Network. On May 19, 2009, Disney and ESPN announced an agreement to allow Comcast Corporation to carry the channels ESPNU and ESPN3.

Comcast's content networks and assets also include E!, Oxygen, Golf Channel, NBCSN, Universal Kids, Bravo, and the regional NBC Sports Networks. When Comcast took majority ownership in NBCUniversal, a significant number of cable networks were added to this list. Comcast's NHL deal obligated them to create a U.S. version of NHL Network, launched in October 2007.

Comcast has also operated local channels in some markets, such as Comcast Television in the Detroit region, Comcast Network in the Philadelphia and Mid-Atlantic regions (formerly CN8), and Comcast Entertainment Television in Denver and parts of Utah. They primarily carried local programs and sports (including, in some cases, serving as the designated overflow channel for local regional sports networks).

DreamWorks Animation
On August 22, 2016, NBCUniversal bought DreamWorks Animation along with its major IP, including Shrek, How to Train Your Dragon, Kung Fu Panda, Trolls, and Madagascar and Big Idea Entertainment owning its famous Christian computer animated direct-to-video franchise VeggieTales.

Sky Group 

Through Sky, Comcast offers any first-party and third-party television programming which using the satellite distribution system to its customers and subscribers across several countries in Europe, such as the United Kingdom, Ireland, Germany, Austria, Switzerland, Italy and Spain. It is Europe's largest media company and pay-TV broadcaster by revenue, with 23 million subscribers and more than 31,000 employees as of 2019.

Until November 2018, Sky was owned by 21st Century Fox through a 39.14% controlling stake; on 9 December 2016, following a previous attempt under News Corporation that was affected by the News International phone hacking scandal, 21st Century Fox announced that it had agreed to buy the remainder of Sky, pending government approval. However, after a bidding war that included Disney (which was, in turn, acquiring most of 21st Century Fox assets), Comcast acquired the entirety of Sky in 2018 for £17.28 per-share.

In 2020, NBCUniversal and Sky Group began preparations to launch an international news channel called NBC Sky World News. The service was also planned for it to be available on Peacock in the United States. Plans for the launch – initially scheduled for summer 2020 – were put on hold due to the COVID-19 pandemic in the United Kingdom. and in August, the proposed service was scrapped, resulting in layoffs of 60 employees. NBC subsequently allowed its free streaming service NBC News Now to be seen internationally, and is available globally on YouTube and on Sky TV and Virgin Media in the UK.

Xumo 

Xumo is a free ad-supported streaming television (FAST) service, which Comcast acquired on February 25, 2020 for an undisclosed amount. The service operates as a business within the Comcast Cable division. Comcast planned to position the service as a compliment to its premium streaming service Peacock (as well as compete with ViacomCBS's Pluto TV and Fox Corporation's Tubi), and leverage its streaming technology, as well as its distribution partnerships with smart TV manufacturers.

On October 19, 2021, Comcast announced "XClass TV", a line of smart TVs manufactured by Hisense that would be powered by the X1 software platform used by its cable services.

In April 2022, Comcast and Charter Communications announced that they would form a joint venture to form a "next-generation streaming platform", with Comcast contributing its Xfinity Flex, XClass TV, and Xumo businesses. In November 2022, Comcast and Charter announced that the joint venture would use the Xumo name, with Xfinity Flex, Xumo, and XClassTV rebranded as Xumo Stream Box, Xumo Play, and Xumo TV respectively.

Professional sports

In 1996, Comcast bought a controlling stake in Spectacor from the company's founder, Ed Snider. Comcast Spectacor holdings now include the Philadelphia Flyers NHL hockey team and their home arena in Philadelphia. Over a number of years, Comcast became majority owner of Comcast SportsNet, as well as Golf Channel and NBCSN (formerly the Outdoor Life Network, then Versus). In 2002, Comcast paid the University of Maryland $25 million for naming rights to the new basketball arena built on the College Park campus, the Xfinity Center. Before it was renamed for Comcast's cable subsidiary, Xfinity Center was called Comcast Center from its opening in 2002 through July 2014. Comcast became the sponsor of NASCAR's second-tier series renaming it the NASCAR Xfinity Series in 2015.

Criticism and controversies

In 2004 and 2007, the American Customer Satisfaction Index (ACSI) survey found that Comcast had the worst customer satisfaction rating of any company or government agency in the country, including the Internal Revenue Service. The ACSI indicates that almost half of all cable customers (regardless of company) have registered complaints, and that cable is the only industry to score below 60 in the ACSI. Comcast's Customer Service Rating by the ACSI surveys indicate that the company's customer service has not improved since the surveys began in 2001. Analysis of the surveys states that "Comcast is one of the lowest scoring companies in ACSI. As its customer satisfaction eroded by 7% over the past year, revenue increased by 12%." The ACSI analysis also addresses this contradiction, stating that "Such pricing power usually comes with some level of monopoly protection and most cable companies have little competition at the local level. This also means that a cable company can do well financially even though its customers are not particularly satisfied."

In April 2014, Comcast was awarded the 2014 "Worst Company in America" award; an annual contest by the consumer affairs blog The Consumerist that runs a series of reader polls to determine the least popular company in America. This was the second time Comcast had been awarded this title, the first being in 2010.

Comcast spends millions of dollars annually on lobbying. Comcast employs the spouses, sons and daughters of mayors, councilmen, commissioners, and other officials to assure its continued preferred market allocations.

Comcast was given an "F" for its corporate governance practices in 2010, by Corporate Library, an independent shareholder-research organization. According to Corporate Library, Comcast's board of directors ability to oversee and control management was severely compromised (at least in 2010) by the fact that several of the directors either worked for the company or had business ties to it (making them susceptible to management pressure), and a third of the directors were over 70 years of age. According to The Wall Street Journal nearly two thirds of the flights of Comcast's $40 million corporate jet purchased for business travel related to the NBCU acquisition, were to CEO Brian Roberts' private homes or to resorts.

On August 1, 2016, Washington State Attorney General Bob Ferguson filed a lawsuit against Comcast Corporation in King County Superior Court, alleging the company's own documents reveal a pattern of illegally deceiving their customers to pad their bottom line by tens of millions of dollars. The FCC issued a $2.3 million fine to Comcast after finding that the company was charging customers for unordered services and equipment. More than a thousand customers issued complaints about these unprecedented charges to their bill. In addition, numerous customers reported inappropriate name-calling and interrogation by customer service representatives. Comcast's executive vice president, David Cohen, admitted the company needed to improve their customer service.

On August 8, 2016 an official Comcast employee confirmed that Comcast was changing native 1080i channels to the 720p60 format. "Official Employees are from multiple teams within Comcast: Product, Support, Leadership."

In February 2017, Comcast was ordered by the self-regulatory National Advertising Review Board to cease using a claim based on Speedtest.net data that it has "America's fastest internet", stating that "Ookla's data showed only that Xfinity consumers who took advantage of the free tests offered on the Speedtest.net website subscribed to tiers of service with higher download speeds than Verizon FiOS consumers who took advantage of the tests." They were also ordered to stop using a claim that the company offers the "fastest in-home Wi-Fi," which was poorly substantiated.

On December 21, 2018, Minnesota State Attorney General Lori Swanson filed a lawsuit against Comcast in Hennepin County over allegations that the company had overcharged customers for cable packages, added home security, service protection plans, modem and other equipment packages to customers bills without their consent, and did not give customers the prepaid 200$ Visa cards they promised to give if customers kept up-to-date on their monthly bills for 90 days on their advertisements. On January 25, 2020, the lawsuit was settled, Comcast being ordered to refund 15,600 customers and give 16,000 other customers debt relief. Comcast was also ordered to disclose the full amounts customers will be charged for using their services on their advertisements.

As of fall 2019, Comcast is the last major cable provider or streamer to neglect to carry the ACC Network, prompting some customers to consider cutting the cord or switching providers. Forbes magazine criticized the decision not to carry the college sports network as violating a fundamental principle of marketing: "never give your customers a reason to switch." North Carolina Governor Roy Cooper asked Comcast and AT&T to carry the network, after which AT&T did so on their U-Verse cable service.

In June 2021, the Supreme Court rejected a petition for review by Comcast regarding an anti-trust lawsuit by Viamedia, Inc. after the Biden administration had recommended against review.

Carbon footprint
Comcast reported total CO2e emissions (direct + indirect) for the twelve months ending 31 December 2020 at 2,291 Kt (-249 /-9.8% y-o-y).

Notes

References

External links
 

 
1963 establishments in Mississippi
1970s initial public offerings
American companies established in 1963
Cable television companies of the United States
Companies based in Philadelphia
Companies listed on the Nasdaq
Conglomerate companies established in 1963
Conglomerate companies of the United States
Entertainment companies established in 1963
Entertainment companies of the United States
Internet service providers of the United States
Mass media companies established in 1963
Mass media companies of the United States
Multinational companies headquartered in the United States
Roberts family (Comcast)
Telecommunications companies established in 1963
Telecommunications companies of the United States
Tupelo, Mississippi
Video on demand
VoIP companies of the United States